The Arabic Bayán is a book written by the Báb around 1848. Its larger sister book is the Persian Bayán. The work is incomplete, containing only eleven Vahids. Each Vahid serves as a chapter and contains nineteen Abwab. The grammar is highly irregular. The work was composed while the Báb was imprisoned in Maku, Iran.

External links
Compendium on the Arabic Bayán
The Text of the Arabic Bayan (in Arabic)

Bábí texts